Jadu Ka Shankh is a 1974 Bollywood drama film directed by Sai Paranjpye.

Cast
Nandita Aras   
Sulabha Deshpande   
Girish Karnad   
Kulbhushan Kharbanda   
Rahul Ranade

External links
 

1974 films
1970s Hindi-language films
1974 drama films
Indian children's films
1974 directorial debut films
Films directed by Sai Paranjpye